Pejman Nouri (born July 13, 1980 in Rezvanshahr, Iran) is a retired Iranian football player, who played and captains for Azadegan League side Khooneh Be Khooneh in the midfield position.

Club career
Born in Rezvanshahr, Gilan Province, he has spent most of his career in Malavan F.C. and then Pegah Gilan F.C., before being transferred to Persepolis.

Persepolis
The 2005–06 season was Pejman's first season in Persepolis which he was coached under Ali Parvin. He was noticed by a lot of the fans because of his hard work during the entire 90 minutes and mostly for his great speed.

The 2006–07 season was really difficult for Nouri because he had to play in the centre defense with fellow midfielder Farzad Ashoubi due to Persepolis's lack of defenders. He became more noticeable during this season and was given the nickname Gladiator by the fans and by the Iranian Sport writers.

During the 2007–08 season, he finally won the league with Persepolis during a season which he was once again pulled back from centre midfield to play as the left defender but in the last few weeks of the season he was put back in the centre midfield position and even scored in the second last game against Saba Battery.

He started the 2008–09 season by scoring the league's first goal against Saipa F.C. with a powerful 30 yards screamer. After Ghotbi resigned as Persepolis's coach, former player and veteran Afshin Peyrovani took over but he did not believe in Nouri as much as Ghotbi did. Nouri was really disappointed that he wasn't starting for Persepolis and almost left the team during the half season transfer period but he decided to stay with Persepolis and try to work things out and he was once again put in the line up by Peyrovani and even when Nelo Vingada took over, Nouri was still one of the starters both in the league and the AFC Champions League.

Return to Malavan
After six years he returned to Malavan and became the first captain. In the first league match of 2009–10 season he scored the winning goal of Malavan vs Mes Kerman. The match which Malavan won 2–1.

The third match of 2010–11 season against Mes was a great match for Nouri. After a very good run from the right flank he crossed the ball and the defender of Mes scored an own goal and after an equalizer by Mes, in final minutes of the match he scored the winning goal of Malavan.

In 2010–11 season, Nouri scored the winning goal of Malavan against his former club Perspolis, both in Azady stadium and in anzali. Some thought that he would not celebrate after scoring but he did and in Navad program he stated that he would always celebrate when he scores for Malavan because he owes his career to Malavan.

Emirates Club
He was transferred to the Emirates Club on loan in summer 2011. He made his debut in a match against Dubai Club and scoring his first goal for the club in a match against Al Wasl FC.

Second Return to Malavan

After so much struggle, in 2012–13, Pejman returned to his beloved club once again. He scored his first goal of the season on second week, in a 2–2 draw against Sanat Naft.

Esteghlal
Nouri joined Esteghlal in June 2013, with a one-year contract. He made his debut in a 2–1 win over Gostaresh Foolad.

International career
Nouri made his debut for the Iranian national football team at the LG cup tournament held in Tehran in August 2003, coming on as a substitute against Iraq. He scored in his third appearance for Iran, in a match against Belarus in Minsk. In October 2006, he was called up to join Team Melli again for an LG cup tournament held in Jordan, as well as the 2007 Asian Cup qualifier against Chinese Taipei. During the time that Ali Daei was the head coach of Team Melli, Nouri was called up a few times but never played. After Afshin Ghotbi was appointed as the head coach for the national team, Nouri was called up again and became a regular starter during the last three matches of the qualification of the 2010 FIFA World Cup which once again proved how much Ghotbi believes in Nouri. Under Carlos Queiroz's management he has become a utility man and increasingly been used in the left back position.

Statistics

 Assist Goals

International goals
Scores and results list Iran's goal tally first.

Playing style

He plays as a center midfielder, but can also play as a defensive midfielder and even a left back. He is known for his hard work, stamina and dribbling. Also if he finds space, he will shoot from long range. He also poses a threat in free-kicks with his deft left-foot shots.

Honours
Persepolis
Iran Pro League (1): 2007–08

Iran
Islamic Solidarity Games:
Bronze medal (1): 2005

References

External links
 Pejman Nouri at TeamMelli.com
 Pejman Nouri's Golas for Malavan
 Interview at Navad 

1980 births
Living people
Iranian footballers
Persepolis F.C. players
Malavan players
Iran international footballers
Pegah Gilan players
2011 AFC Asian Cup players
Emirates Club players
Esteghlal F.C. players
Persian Gulf Pro League players
Iranian expatriate sportspeople in the United Arab Emirates
Expatriate footballers in the United Arab Emirates
Iranian expatriate footballers
Association football midfielders
UAE Pro League players
Sportspeople from Gilan province